"Love Him" can refer to:

Love Him (album), a 1963 Doris Day album
"Love Him" (song), the album's title track, a lyrical variation of "Love Her" by Barry Mann and Cynthia Weil